Peni Parker is a superhero appearing in publications by Marvel Comics. She is an alternative version of Spider-Man. The character is depicted as a 14-year-old high school student who was adopted by Aunt May and Uncle Ben following the death of her father/caretaker. She pilots a psychically-powered mech suit built by her father known as the SP//dr, which is partially controlled by a radioactive spider that also shares a psychic link with her.

Both Peni Parker and SP//dr have made scant appearances in media, with their most prominent being the animated film Spider-Man: Into the Spider-Verse, in which the former is voiced by Kimiko Glenn.

Publication history
Peni Parker and SP//dr were created by writer Gerard Way and artist Jake Wyatt, and first appeared in the Spider-Verse comic book Edge of Spider-Verse #5 in October 2014. According to Way, SP//dr "is  three vital components: a pilot, a machine, and a radioactive sentient spider acting as one half of the brain that makes it all work." SP//dr’s story was continued in the Spider-Geddon comic book, Edge of Spider-Geddon #2 by Alberto Albuquerque.

Fictional character biography

Spider-Verse
Peni's father acted as the original pilot of the SP//dr mecha, in which he protected New York from crime and other dangers. After his mysterious death, Peni is approached by her Aunt May and Uncle Ben to become the new pilot of the SP//dr. In order to do so however, she has to be bitten by the sentient radioactive spider which controls part of the suit. Soon after being bitten, Peni becomes the new protector of the city. Five years later, she battles her universe’s version of Mysterio - an obsessed fanboy of hers. Peni eventually teams up with her universe's version of Daredevil – who had known her father – to battle a group of criminals before being approached by Spider-Ham and Old Man Spider to join the Spider-Army to fight the Inheritors.

Spider-Geddon
After the events of "Spider-Verse", Peni is approached by a girl named Addy Brock, who wonders if she was really the SP//dr pilot. Peni ignores her, but Addy retorts by saying she is not as special as she thinks. At home, Peni tries to talk to Ben and May about being special, but she gets ignored. While improving the SP//dr's web shooters, she notices Addy walking in the base and follows her; only to find another mech-suit similar to the SP//dr, only in black and powered by a sym-engine called VEN#m, with Addy as its pilot. Peni becomes furious at her aunt and uncle for not telling her about this. When a kaiju-like creature named M.O.R.B.I.U.S. starts to drain the city's electrical energy, SP//dr goes after it, but is quickly defeated. In order to defeat M.O.R.B.I.U.S., Peni's aunt and uncle send VEN#m to defeat the creature. It is successful, but the creature causes VEN#m to malfunction; causing the mech suit to attain sentience and consume Addy. When May flies in to fix the problem manually, it consumes her as well. SP//dr confronts VEN#m, but the black mech suit overpowers her until she uses her improved web shooters to defeat it. However, she is too late to save her Aunt May and Addy, who have vanished from inside the suit. Following the battle, Peni and Ben have a heart to heart, but Spider-Ham re-appears to recruit Peni to help defeat the Inheritors once more during the events of Spider-Geddon.

In other media

Television
SP//dr makes a non-speaking cameo appearance in the Ultimate Spider-Man episode "Return to the Spider-Verse" Pt. 4, as one of several alternate reality Spider-Men that the villainous Wolf Spider took hostage to siphon their powers before the "prime" Spider-Man, Kid Arachnid, and Spider-Gwen arrive to save them.

Film
Peni Parker and SP//dr appear in Spider-Man: Into the Spider-Verse, with the former voiced by Kimiko Glenn. This version of Peni takes on an anime aesthetic and is incredibly perky while SP//dr is a one-piece capsule cockpit with a dome-shaped one-way visor that provides Peni with a HUD-style view, magnetically manipulated appendages, and various tools in its fingers. They arrive in Miles Morales' universe along with Spider-Ham and Spider-Man Noir due to the Kingpin's machinations and join forces with them, among other "Spider-People", to return to their respective home universes. While fighting the Kingpin's henchmen, SP//dr is severely damaged by the Scorpion, but Peni manages to rescue the radioactive spider within it before returning to her universe to rebuild SP//dr.

Video games
 SP//dr appears as a playable character in Spider-Man Unlimited.
 Peni Parker and SP//dr appear as playable characters in Marvel Contest of Champions.

Merchandise
 Hasbro released a Build-A-Figure of the comics' version of SP//dr in the Marvel Legends toy line.
 Hasbro also released a separate set of Peni Parker and Sp//dr from Spider-Man: Into The Spider-Verse in the film's tie-in toyline.

References

External links
 Peni Parker at Marvel Wiki
 She is the second spider hero which has the mecha concept after Takuya Yamashiro in “Invincible Spider-Man” a Japanese tokusatsu série created by Marvel with Toei. 

Incarnations of Spider-Man
Fictional characters from New York City
Comics characters introduced in 2014
Japanese superheroes
Marvel Comics child superheroes
Marvel Comics female superheroes
Marvel Comics mutates
Marvel Comics scientists
Fictional characters from parallel universes
Spider-Man characters
Japanese-American superheroes
Fictional female scientists